Don Higgins is a New Zealand public servant and diplomat. In June 2022 he was appointed Administrator of Tokelau. 

Higgins had previously served as High Commissioner of New Zealand to the Solomon Islands. From 2014 to 2016 he served as High Commissioner to Kiribati.

References 

Living people
Year of birth missing (living people)
New Zealand public servants
New Zealand diplomats
High Commissioners of New Zealand to Kiribati
High Commissioners of New Zealand to the Solomon Islands
Administrators of Tokelau